The 2020 Atlantic hurricane season featured a total of 31 tropical or subtropical cyclones, making it the most active Atlantic hurricane season on record. All but one cyclone became a named storm. Of the 30 named storms, 14 developed into hurricanes, and a record-tying seven further intensified into major hurricanes. It was the second and final season to use the Greek letter storm naming system, the first being 2005, the previous record. Of the 30 named storms, 11 of them made landfall in the contiguous United States, breaking the record of nine set in 1916. During the season, 27 tropical storms established a new record for earliest formation date by storm number. This season also featured a record 10 tropical cyclones that underwent rapid intensification, tying it with 1995, as well as holding the record for most Category 4 hurricanes in a singular season in the Atlantic Basin. This unprecedented activity was fueled by a La Niña that developed in the summer months of 2020 as it did, continue a stretch of above-average seasonal activity that began in 2016. Despite the record-high activity, this was the first season since 2015 in which no Category 5 hurricane formed.

The season officially started on June 1 and officially ended on November 30. However, tropical cyclogenesis is possible at any time of the year, as demonstrated by the early formation of Tropical Storms Arthur and Bertha, on May 16 and 27, respectively. This was the sixth consecutive year with a pre-season system and the second of these seasons to have two, with the other being 2016. The first hurricane, Hurricane Hanna, made landfall in Texas on July 25. Hurricane Isaias formed on July 31, and made landfall in The Bahamas and North Carolina in early August, both times as a Category 1 hurricane; Isaias caused $4.8 billion in damage overall. In late August, Laura made landfall in Louisiana as a Category 4 hurricane, becoming the strongest tropical cyclone on record in terms of wind speed to make landfall in the state, alongside the 1856 Last Island hurricane and Ida. Laura caused at least $19 billion in damage and 77 deaths. September was the most active month on record in the Atlantic, with ten named storms. Slow-moving Hurricane Sally impacted the US Gulf Coast, causing severe flooding. The Greek alphabet was used for only the second time, starting on September 17 with Subtropical Storm Alpha, which made landfall in Portugal on the following day.

Hurricane Zeta struck Louisiana on October 28, becoming the fourth named storm of the season to make landfall in the state, tying the record set in 2002. Zeta also struck the United States later in the calendar year than any major hurricane on record. On the last day of October, Hurricane Eta formed and made landfall in Nicaragua at Category 4 strength on November 3. Eta ultimately led to the deaths of at least 175 people and caused $8.3 billion in damage. Then, on November 10, Tropical Storm Theta became the record-breaking 29th named storm of the season and, three days later, Hurricane Iota formed in the Caribbean. Iota rapidly intensified into a high-end Category 4 hurricane, which also made 2020 the only recorded season with two major hurricanes in November. Iota ultimately made landfall in the same general area of Nicaragua that Eta had just weeks earlier and caused catastrophic damage. Overall, the tropical cyclones of the 2020 Atlantic hurricane season collectively caused at least 417 deaths and over $51 billion in damage, totaling to the seventh costliest season on record.

All forecasting agencies predicted above-average activity, some well-above-average, citing factors such as the expectation of low wind shear, abnormally warm sea surface temperatures, and a neutral El Niño–Southern Oscillation or La Niña. Climate change likely played a role in the record-breaking season, with respect to intensity and rainfall. However, each prediction, even those issued during the season, underestimated the actual amount of activity. Early in 2020, officials in the United States expressed concerns the hurricane season could exacerbate the effects of the COVID-19 pandemic for coastal residents due to the potential for a breakdown of safety protocols such as social distancing and stay-at-home orders.

Seasonal forecasts

Forecasts of hurricane activity are issued before each hurricane season by noted hurricane experts, such as Philip J. Klotzbach and his associates at Colorado State University (CSU), and separately by NOAA forecasters. Klotzbach's team (formerly led by William M. Gray) defined the average (1981 to 2010) hurricane season as featuring 12.1 tropical storms, 6.4 hurricanes, 2.7 major hurricanes (storms reaching at least Category 3 strength in the Saffir–Simpson scale), and an accumulated cyclone energy (ACE) index of 106 units. Broadly speaking, ACE is a measure of the power of a tropical or subtropical storm multiplied by the length of time it existed. NOAA defines a season as above normal, near normal or below normal by a combination of the number of named storms, the number reaching hurricane strength, the number reaching major hurricane strength, and the ACE Index.

Pre-season forecasts
On December 19, 2019, Tropical Storm Risk (TSR), a public consortium consisting of experts on insurance, risk management, and seasonal climate forecasting at University College London, issued an extended-range forecast predicting a slightly above-average hurricane season. In its report, the organization called for 15 named storms, 7 hurricanes, 4 major hurricanes, and an ACE index of 105 units. This forecast was based on the prediction of near-average trade winds and slightly warmer than normal sea surface temperatures across the tropical Atlantic as well as a neutral El Niño–Southern Oscillation (ENSO) phase in the equatorial Pacific. On April 2, 2020, forecasters at CSU echoed predictions of an above-average season, forecasting 16 named storms, 8 hurricanes, 4 major hurricanes, and an ACE index of 150 units. The organization posted significantly heightened probabilities for hurricanes tracking through the Caribbean and hurricanes striking the U.S. coastline. TSR updated their forecast on April 7, predicting 16 named storms, 8 hurricanes, 3 major hurricanes, and an ACE index of 130 units. On April 13, the University of Arizona (UA) predicted a potentially hyperactive hurricane season: 19 named storms, 10 hurricanes, 5 major hurricanes, and accumulated cyclone energy index of 163 units. A similar prediction of 18 named storms, 9 hurricanes, and 4 major hurricanes was released by The Weather Company on April 15. Following that, North Carolina State University released a similar forecast on April 17, also calling for a possibly hyperactive season with 18–22 named storms, 8–11 hurricanes and 3–5 major hurricanes.  On April 21, the Pennsylvania State University Earth Science System Center also predicted high numbers, 19.8 +/- 4.4 total named storms, range 15–24, best estimate 20.

On May 20, Mexico's Servicio Meteorológico Nacional released their forecast for an above-average season with 15–19 named storms, 7–9 hurricanes, and 3–4 major hurricanes. The UK Met Office released their outlook that same day, predicting average activity with 13 tropical storms, 7 hurricanes, and 3 major hurricanes expected to develop between June and November 2020. They also predicted an ACE index of around 110 units. NOAA issued their forecast on May 21, calling for a 60% chance of an above-normal season with 13–19 named storms, 6–10 hurricanes, 3–6 major hurricanes, and an ACE index between 110% and 190% of the median. They cited the ongoing warm phase of the Atlantic multidecadal oscillation and the expectation of continued ENSO-neutral or even La Niña conditions during the peak of the season as factors that would increase activity. TSR revised their forecast downward slightly on May 28, this time predicting 17 named storms, 8 hurricanes, and 3 major hurricanes, while increasing the projected ACE index to 135.

Mid-season forecasts
CSU released an updated forecast on June 4, calling for 19 named storms, 9 hurricanes, and 4 major hurricanes. UA issued their second prediction for the season on June 12, decreasing their numbers to 17 named storms, 11 hurricanes, and 4 major hurricanes. On July 7, CSU released another updated forecast, predicting 20 named storms, 9 hurricanes, and 4 major hurricanes. That same day, TSR revised their forecast to 18 named storms, 8 hurricanes, and 4 major hurricanes. On July 16, The Weather Company released an updated forecast, calling for 20 named storms, 8 hurricanes, and 4 major hurricanes.

On August 5, CSU released an additional updated forecast, their final for 2020, calling for a near-record-breaking season, predicting a total of 24 named storms, 12 hurricanes, and 5 major hurricanes, citing the anomalously low wind shear and surface pressures across the basin during the month of July and substantially warmer than average tropical Atlantic and developing La Niña conditions. On August 5, TSR released an updated forecast, their final for 2020, also calling for a near-record-breaking season, predicting a total of 24 named storms, 10 hurricanes, and 4 major hurricanes, citing the favorable July trade winds, low wind shear, warmer than average tropical Atlantic, and the anticipated La Niña. The following day, NOAA released their second forecast for the season, in which they called for an "extremely active" season, predicting it would contain 19–25 named storms, 7–11 hurricanes, and 3–6 major hurricanes. This was one of the most active forecasts ever released by NOAA for an Atlantic hurricane season.

Seasonal summary

The 2020 Atlantic hurricane season officially began on June 1 and ended on November 30. The season featured 31 tropical depressions, 30 of which became tropical or subtropical storms. The latter total surpassed the previous record of 28 set in 2005. Of the 30 tropical or subtropical storms, 14 of those intensified into hurricanes, which is the second highest number ever observed, behind only 2005. Seven of the hurricanes intensified into major hurricanes, tying 2005 for the most in one season. It was the fifth consecutive Atlantic hurricane season with above average activity, exceeding the previous longest streak of four years between 1998 and 2001. A total of 10 tropical cyclones underwent rapid intensification, tying the record set in 1995.

The season also featured activity at a record pace. The third named storm and each one from the fifth onwards formed on an earlier date in the year than the corresponding storm in any other season since reliable records began in 1851. The ACE index for the 2020 Atlantic hurricane season as calculated by Colorado State University using data from the National Hurricane Center was 179.8 units, reflecting the season's well-above-average activity. The totals represent the sum of the squares for every (sub) tropical storm's intensity of at least , divided by 10,000. Thus, tropical depressions are not included in the ACE index value.

The season marked the extension of the warm phase of the Atlantic multidecadal oscillation, which has been ongoing since 1995. The warm AMO favors active Atlantic hurricane seasons and tropical cyclones which are more intense and often have longer durations. As a result, sea surface temperatures across the Atlantic basin were generally warmer-than-average. A strong west African monsoon, favorable wind patterns from Africa, weaker vertical wind shear all aided in the formation of tropical cyclones. Furthermore, the presence of a La Niña contributed to the unprecedented amount of activity during the 2020 Atlantic hurricane season.

Climate change also likely played a role in the record-breaking season. Scientific American noted that "As the oceans absorb more and more of the excess heat trapped by greenhouse gases, waters will get warmer earlier in the season, which could help set new records in the future." A formal attribution study showed that the extreme rainfall was higher than in a counterfactual without climate change, especially for high-intensity storms. Matthew Rosencrans, the lead forecaster at the National Weather Service, emphasized that climate change has been linked to the intensity of storms and their slow movements, but not to the amount of activity, which might instead be increasing due to improvements in technology.

Overall, the Atlantic tropical cyclones of 2020 collectively resulted in 416 deaths and more than $51.114 billion in damage, making the season the fifth costliest on record. A total of eleven named storms made landfall in the United States, breaking the previous record of nine in 1916. Six of these named storms struck the United States at hurricane intensity, tying 1886 and 1985 for the highest number in a single season. Eight of the eleven named storms struck the Gulf Coast of the United States. A total of 13 landfalls occurred outside of the United States, also a record. Furthermore, Zeta became the latest major hurricane to strike the United States when the cyclone made landfall in Louisiana on October 28, surpassing the previous recordholder, the 1921 Tampa Bay hurricane, by three days.

The United States reported approximately $37 billion in damage from the Atlantic tropical cyclones it was affected by in 2020. Six hurricanes inflicted at least $1 billion in damage in the United States, two more than the previous record of four in 2004 and 2005. The entire coastline from Texas to Maine was placed under some form of a watch or warning in relation to a tropical system, while only Florida's Jefferson and Wakulla counties would not be issued a tropical cyclone watch or warning during the season. Only five counties along the East Coast or Gulf Coast of the United States did not experience tropical storm-force winds. Louisiana in particular was heavily impacted in 2020, with the state recording four landfalls – three hurricanes and one tropical storm – tying the record set in 2002.

Central America also experienced devastating impacts during the 2020 Atlantic hurricane season, especially in Honduras and Nicaragua. Both nations were struck by hurricanes Eta and Iota within a few weeks. The former caused at least $6.8 billion in damage in Central America, while the latter caused approximately $1.4 billion in damage in the region, mostly in Honduras and Nicaragua. In Honduras, both cyclones destroyed tens of thousands of homes and severely impacted more than 4 million people. Furthermore, the Honduras Foreign Debt Forum noted that the two hurricanes set back economic development in Honduras by 22 years.

The season also occurred during the COVID-19 pandemic. Early in the year, officials in the United States expressed concerns the hurricane season could potentially exacerbate the effects of the pandemic for U.S. coastal residents. As expressed in an op-ed of the Journal of the American Medical Association, "there exists an inherent incompatibility between strategies for population protection from hurricane hazards: evacuation and sheltering (i.e., transporting and gathering people together in groups)", and "effective approaches to slow the spread of COVID-19: physical distancing and stay-at-home orders (i.e., separating and keeping people apart)." A study published by GeoHealth in December 2020 confirmed a correlation between destination counties (a county in which an evacuee flees to) and an increase in COVID-19 cases.

Pre/early season activity

Tropical cyclogenesis began in the month of May, with tropical storms Arthur and Bertha. This marked the first occurrence of two pre-season tropical storms in the Atlantic since 2016, and the first occurrence of two named storms in the month of May since 2012. For the sixth consecutive year, a tropical cyclone developed in the Atlantic basin prior to the official start of the Atlantic hurricane season, extending the record, which was broken during the previous season. Tropical Storm Cristobal formed on June 1, followed by Tropical Storm Dolly on June 23. Tropical storms Edouard, Fay, and Gonzalo, along with hurricanes Hanna and Isaias, formed in July. Hanna became the first hurricane of the season and made landfall in South Texas, while Isaias became the second hurricane of the season and struck much of the Caribbean and the East Coast of the United States. Tropical Depression Ten also formed in late July off the coast of West Africa but quickly dissipated. July 2020 tied 2005 for the most active July on record in the basin, with five named storms.

Peak season activity

Tropical storms Josephine and Kyle formed in August, as did hurricanes Laura and Marco. Marco ultimately became the third hurricane of the season, but rapidly weakened and then dissipated near the south central Louisiana coastline. Laura subsequently became the fourth hurricane and first major hurricane of the season. The hurricane later made landfall in southwest Louisiana on August 27 at Category 4 strength with  winds. Additionally, a tropical depression formed on the final day of the month which intensified into Tropical Storm Omar on September 1.

September featured the formations of nine named storms: tropical storms Rene, Vicky, Wilfred, and Beta; Subtropical Storm Alpha; and hurricanes Nana (which rapidly formed and was named a few hours ahead of Omar), Paulette, Sally, and Teddy. This swarm of storms coincided with the peak of the hurricane season and the development of La Niña conditions. Nana developed on September 1 and made landfall in Belize as a Category 1 hurricane. Paulette struck Bermuda as a Category 2 hurricane, becoming the first tropical or subtropical cyclone to make landfall on that British overseas territory since Gonzalo in 2014. Sally made landfall in Florida just south of Miami as a tropical depression before also striking the Gulf Coast of the United States as a slow-moving Category 2 hurricane and causing extensive damage there.

Teddy, the season's eighth hurricane and second major hurricane formed on September 12, while Vicky formed two days later. With the formation of the latter, five tropical cyclones were simultaneously active in the Atlantic basin for the first time since 1971. Meanwhile, Hurricane Teddy went on to strike Atlantic Canada after transitioning into an extremely large extratropical cyclone on September 23. Additionally, Paulette redeveloped as a tropical storm on September 20 before once again becoming post-tropical two days later. Alpha developed atypically far east in the Atlantic and became the first tropical cyclone on record to strike Portugal. Beta's intensification into a tropical storm made September 2020 the most active month on record, with 10 named storms. Beta went on to make landfall in Texas and impact the Deep South before dissipating, marking an abrupt end to the heavy peak season activity.

Late season activity

October and November were extremely active, with seven named storms developing, five of which intensified into major hurricanesmore than twice the number recorded during this period in any previous season. Hurricane Gamma formed on October 2, before strengthening into the ninth hurricane of the season on October 3. Shortly afterward, Gamma made landfall on the Yucatán Peninsula as a minimal Category 1 hurricane. On the next day, Hurricane Delta developed in the Caribbean south of Jamaica and became the 10th hurricane of the season. Delta explosively intensified into a Category 4 hurricane, before rapidly weakening and making landfall on the Yucatán Peninsula on October 7, as a high-end Category 2 hurricane. It regained Category 3 status in the Gulf of Mexico, before weakening again and making its second landfall in Louisiana on October 9.

After 14 more days of inactivity in the basin, Tropical Storm Epsilon formed in mid-October and became the season's 11th hurricane on October 20. By the following day, Epsilon became a Category 3 hurricane, making it the fourth major hurricane of the season. Afterward, the storm weakened as it slowly moved northward and then northeastward, before becoming extratropical on October 26. During the same month, Hurricane Zeta formed southwest of the Cayman Islands and took a nearly identical track to Delta, striking the Yucatán Peninsula late on October 26, before turning northeastward, accelerating, and making landfall in southeast Louisiana as a Category 3 hurricane, on October 28. Then, after moving rapidly across the eastern United States, its extratropical remnants left behind accumulating snow across parts of New England.

Hurricane Eta, the season's sixth major hurricane, made landfall as a Category 4 storm along the Caribbean coast of Nicaragua on November 3. Eta subsequently moved back into the Caribbean and restrengthened into a tropical storm before taking a winding and erratic path that went over Cuba and through the Florida Keys before stalling in the southern Gulf of Mexico. It then moved north-northeast towards the west coast of Florida, briefly restrengthening into a minimal hurricane along the way. On November 10, Subtropical Storm Theta formed from a non-tropical low over the northeastern Atlantic, before transitioning to a tropical storm later that day. Just after Eta became extratropical off the U.S. East Coast, Hurricane Iota formed over the central Caribbean on November 13, tying 2005 for the most tropical and subtropical cyclones in one year. The 2020 season became the first with two major hurricanes in the month of November. Iota then went on to ravage the same areas in Central America that Eta had devastated only two weeks earlier, and dissipated on November 18, over El Salvador.

Systems

Tropical Storm Arthur

The NHC issued a Special Tropical Weather Outlook on May 15 concerning the potential for tropical or subtropical cyclogenesis from a trough of low pressure located over the Straits of Florida. Six hours later, an Air Force reconnaissance aircraft found that it had attained tropical storm strength. Tropical Storm Arthur weaved along the Gulf Stream and changed little in intensity as it encountered increasing wind shear. Shortly thereafter, Arthur interacted with a non-tropical front and became an extratropical cyclone by 12:00 UTC on May 20. The low turned southeast before dissipating near Bermuda a day later.

The precursor of Arthur dropped heavy rainfall over portions of the Bahamas, Cuba, and Florida. Precipitation in South Florida peaked at  near Marathon. Overall, stormy conditions in the state caused $112,000 in damage. After Arthur became a tropical cyclone, tropical storm watches were issued in North Carolina from Surf City to Duck and from Pamlico Sound to Albemarle Sound on May 16; these were upgraded the following to tropical storm warnings as Arthur approached the Outer Banks. When Arthur passed by to the east, it produced an area where  of rainfall fell across the Inner Banks region of North Carolina. It also created minor storm surge from Cape Hatteras to the southeastern Virginia coast.

Tropical Storm Bertha

On May 26, a weak low-pressure area developed over central and northeastern Florida. By 06:00 UTC the next day, the system, then near the Georgia and South Carolina coasts, developed a well-defined center and sufficient deep convection to be considered a tropical cyclone. At 13:30 UTC that same day, the storm made landfall near Isle of Palms, South Carolina. Inland, the system turned north and accelerated, before quickly weakening to a tropical depression. During the early hours of May 28, it transitioned into an extratropical cyclone over western Virginia, before dissipating over the Northern Panhandle of West Virginia several hours later.

However, floodwaters entered some buildings in Hialeah and Miami Beach, while roof collapses were reported in Hallandale Beach and Hollywood. The storm also spawned an EF1 tornado in the vicinity of Redland, causing minor damage, although it was directly associated with the storm. Damage in Florida totaled approximately $71,000. There was localized flash flooding in coastal South Carolina and in parts of North Carolina, especially the Charlotte area. An EF1 tornado in Warren County caused about $50,000 in damage, although this was also not directly related to Bertha. Additionally, the remnants of Bertha caused flash flooding in portions of West Virginia. Overall, Bertha left at least $133,000 in damage.

Tropical Storm Cristobal

A large area of disturbed weather, associated with the remnant low of Eastern Pacific Tropical Storm Amanda, moved northwestward across the Yucatán Peninsula of Mexico and emerged over the Bay of Campeche on June 1. Later that day, at 18:00 UTC, the remnant low developed into Tropical Depression Three. By 12:00 UTC on June 2, the depression strengthened into Tropical Storm Cristobal. Throughout the remainder of the day, Cristobal's wind field became more symmetrical and well defined and it gradually strengthened, with falling barometric pressure as the storm meandered towards the Mexican coastline. As Cristobal drifted inland, it weakened to a tropical depression as the overall structure of the storm deteriorated.

The storm turned northward on June 5 and by 06:00 UTC that day, despite being situated inland over the Yucatán Peninsula, Cristobal re-intensified into a tropical storm. As Cristobal moved farther north into the Gulf of Mexico, it again reached winds of  before dry air and interaction with an upper-level trough to the east began to displace most of the central convection to the east and north of the center. Late on June 7, Cristobal made landfall over southeastern Louisiana. The system weakened to a tropical depression on the next day, as it moved inland over the state. The storm continued northward along the Mississippi River Valley, before becoming an extratropical low early on June 10 over Iowa. The low moved northeastward across Wisconsin, the Upper Peninsula of Michigan, Northern Ontario, and the southern Hudson Bay, before dissipating on June 12.

On June 1, the government of Mexico issued a tropical storm warning from Campeche westward to Puerto de Veracruz. Residents at risk were evacuated. Nine thousand Mexican National Guard members were summoned to aid in preparations and repairs. Significant rain fell across much of Southern Mexico and Central America. Over two-hundred homes and three hospitals in Mexico experienced some degree of damage. In El Salvador, a mudslide caused seven people to go missing. Street flooding occurred as far away as Nicaragua. Tropical storm watches and warnings were also issued along the Gulf Coast of the United States beginning on June 5. Coastal flooding occurred in Alabama, Florida, Louisiana, and Mississippi. Cristobal inflicted damage to 30 businesses, 23 homes, 23 roads, and 13 public buildings in Mississippi. Damage in the United States was estimated at $310 million. The storm caused an estimated $665 million in damage throughout all impacted areas. At least six deaths were connected to Cristobal, with three in Mexico and three in the United States.

Tropical Storm Dolly

Around June 17, an area of disturbed weather developed just north of the Bahamas after part of a tropical wave and an upper-level trough interacted. The disturbance moved north and organized into a low-pressure area early on June 22. Mid-level dry air and sea surface temperatures that were only marginally favorable resulted in very little strengthening on June 22. However, after moving east-northeastward and away from an upper low, the cyclone developed more deep convection and intensified into Subtropical Storm Dolly by 06:00 UTC on June 23. However, convection rapidly diminished after Dolly moved north of the Gulf Stream and encountered drier air. The remnant low continued northeastward and dissipated south of Newfoundland early the next day.

Tropical Storm Edouard

A weak frontal system moved offshore from the Mid-Atlantic in early July, and an area of low pressure formed over its southern portion well to the east of the northeast Florida coast on July 3. The system initially moved east-northeastward and then northeastward on the north side of a large mid-level ridge. Despite the marginal conditions for development, a large convective burst formed over the center, allowing it to strengthen into Tropical Storm Edouard at 00:00 UTC on July 6.

By then, however, it was entering region of strong southwesterly vertical wind shear and colder water, and was approaching a frontal system. The extratropical low began to slowly weaken on July 8, turning eastward and continuing to move rapidly within the strong mid-latitude westerlies. It crossed southern Ireland and the southern United Kingdom on July 9 and dissipated over the latter country that day.

The Bermuda Weather Service issued a gale warning for the entirety of the island chain in advance of the system on July 4. Unsettled weather later ensued, and the depression caused tropical storm-force wind gusts and moderate rainfall on the island early on July 5. Impacts were relatively minor. Edouard's extratropical remnants brought brief, but heavy, rain to the British Isles, the Netherlands, Germany, southern Denmark and north-west Poland.

Tropical Storm Fay

The NHC began to track an area of disorganized cloudiness and showers over the far northern Gulf of Mexico early on July 5. This area was associated with the remaining section of the surface trough from which Edouard had recently formed. The disturbance moved inland over the Florida Panhandle by 06:00 UTC the next day. It subsequently emerged off of the South Carolina coast into the Atlantic on July 8. Once offshore, the low moved northeastward, and around 18:00 UTC on July 9, the center re-formed and became better defined near an area of strong convection. At about the same, an Air Force Reserve Hurricane Hunter aircraft observed that the system, then near Cape Hatteras, North Carolina, was producing sustained tropical-storm-force winds. The low was then designated as Tropical Storm Fay. After formation, the storm moved northward to the east of the Mid-Atlantic states. It quickly lost intensity inland, degenerating into a remnant low while over southeastern New York and later being absorbed into a larger mid-latitude low over southeastern Canada.

Tropical storm warnings were issued for coastal areas of New Jersey, New York, Connecticut, and Rhode Island on July 9. A similar warning was issued for coastal Delaware on July 10. New Jersey experienced some of the worst impacts from the storm. Heavy rainfall caused flooding in several Jersey Shore towns and resulted in closures along many roadways, including the New Jersey Turnpike. Wind gusts up to  left at least 10,000 people in the state without electricity. Fay directly caused the deaths of two people, who drowned due to rip currents; four others drowned due to the residual high surf conditions after Fay had passed by. Overall, damage from the storm in the Northeastern United States totaled at least $350 million, based on wind and storm surge damage on residential, commercial, and industrial properties.

Tropical Storm Gonzalo

A dry, thermal low-pressure area merged with a tropical wave just offshore the west coast of Africa on July 15. Scatterometer data early on July 21 indicated that a small, but well-defined low-pressure area formed well east of the Lesser Antilles. Light wind shear and sea surface temperatures of  allowed the depression to intensify into Tropical Storm Gonzalo around 06:00 UTC on July 22. Gonzalo moved generally westward due to the Bermuda-Azores high-pressure. The storm continued to strengthen throughout the day, with an eyewall under a central dense overcast and hints of a developing eye becoming evident.

Although convection quickly redeveloped, the storm then encountered high wind shear, causing the cyclone to weaken. It weakened to a tropical depression before landfall on Trinidad just north of Manzanilla Beach. Likely due to land interaction, Gonzalo weakened further and degenerated into an open trough near Venezuela's Paria Peninsula by 00:00 UTC on July 26.

Although the system moved westward across the Cabo Verde Islands, little rainfall was recorded as the disturbance had a limited amount of convection then. On July 23, hurricane watches were issued for Barbados and Saint Vincent and the Grenadines, and a tropical storm watch was issued later that day for Grenada and Tobago. After Gonzalo failed to strengthen into a hurricane on July 24, the hurricane and tropical storm watches were replaced with tropical storm warnings. The storm brought squally weather to Trinidad and Tobago and parts of southern Grenada. However, the storm's impact ended up being significantly smaller than originally anticipated. Only two reports of wind damage were received: a fallen tree on a health facility in Les Coteaux and a damaged bus stop roof in Argyle.

Hurricane Hanna

On July 11, a tropical wave exited the west coast of Africa. Dry air caused the system to be mostly devoid of convection by the time it reached the Lesser Antilles on July 17. Thereafter, unfavorable upper-level winds prevented the wave from developing significantly, as it crossed the Bahamas and Florida on July 20 and July 21. After the wave reached the Gulf of Mexico, upper-level winds became more favorable. Despite light to moderate wind shear and warm seas, mid-level dry air caused the depression to strengthen slowly. About 24 hours after forming, the depression became Tropical Storm Hanna as it moved west-northwestward.

Later on July 24, Hanna began intensifying slightly faster as convective banding increased and an eye feature developed. That same day, the cyclone also curved westward due to a strengthening deep-layer ridge to the north. Hanna reached hurricane intensity at 12:00 UTC on July 25. Hanna made landfall on Padre Island, Texas, at the same intensity at 22:00 UTC on July 25, one hour and fifteen minutes before making landfall in Kenedy County. The system rapidly weakened after moving inland, dropping to tropical depression status at 18:00 UTC on July 26 near Monterrey, Nuevo León, and then dissipating shortly thereafter.

The precursor disturbance to Hanna dropped heavy rain to parts of Hispaniola, the Florida Keys, and Cuba. In Walton County, Florida, a 33-year-old man drowned in rip currents while rescuing his son. In portions of Louisiana, Mississippi, Alabama, and the Florida Panhandle, the outer bands of Hanna brought heavy rainfall, even threatening street flooding in New Orleans. Immediately after the system was classified as a tropical depression, tropical storm watches were issued for much of the Texas shoreline. At 21:00 UTC on July 24, a hurricane warning was issued from Baffin Bay to Mesquite Bay, Texas, due to Hanna being forecast to become a hurricane before landfall. As the hurricane approached landfall, Texas governor Greg Abbott announced the deployment of 17 COVID-19 mobile testing teams focused on shelters and 100 medical personnel provided by the Texas National Guard. Hanna brought storm surge flooding, destructive winds, torrential rainfall, flash flooding and five isolated EF0 tornadoes across South Texas and Northeastern Mexico. In the former, the storm destroyed several mobile homes and deroofed many poorly-built structures. About 200,000 homes in Cameron and Hidalgo counties combined suffered power outages. Floodwaters entered dozens of buildings in low-lying areas. In the United States, Hanna indirectly caused five deaths and caused about $1.1 billion in damage. In Mexico, heavy rain fell in Coahuila, Nuevo León, and Tamaulipas. More than 250 homes in Coahuila were inundated, while at least 45 neighborhoods in Reynosa reported flood damage. The cyclone directly caused four deaths in Mexico and caused approximately $100 million in damage.

Hurricane Isaias

A tropical wave emerged into the Atlantic from the west coast of Africa on July 24. The wave gradually organized and became better defined, developing a broad area of low pressure on the following day. Due to the threat the system posed to the Lesser Antilles, the NHC initiated advisories on the system as Potential Tropical Cyclone Nine at 15:00 UTC on July 28. By the next day, the disturbance was producing heavy rains and gale-force winds. The cyclone made landfall about 16 hours later near San Pedro de Macorís, Dominican Republic. Shortly after the storm's eye moved offshore the northern coast of Hispaniola early on July 31, Isaias intensified into a hurricane. Nine hours later, it made landfall on Great Inagua Island in the Bahamas.

It then turned north-northwest, remaining offshore Florida and Georgia while fluctuating between  wind speeds. As the cyclone accelerated northeastward and approached the Carolina coastline, wind shear relaxed, allowing the storm to quickly re-intensify into a hurricane at 18:00 UTC on August 3. Following landfall, Isaias accelerated and weakened slowly, dropping below hurricane status at 06:00 UTC over North Carolina. The storm passed over the Mid-Atlantic states before transitioning to an extratropical low around 00:00 UTC on August 5 while situated over central Vermont, and dissipating several hours later over Quebec.

Numerous tropical storm watches warnings as well as hurricane watches and hurricane warnings were issued for the Lesser Antilles, Greater Antilles, Bahamas, Cuba, and the entire East Coast of the United States. Isaias caused devastating flooding and wind damage in Puerto Rico and the Dominican Republic. Several towns were left without electricity and drinking water in Puerto Rico. In the United States, Isaias triggered a large tornado outbreak that prompted the issuance of 109 tornado warnings across 12 states. A total of 39 tornadoes touched down, several of which caused significant damage. Impact was mostly minor in Florida and Georgia. Storm surge in South Carolina left significant impacts in Horry County, with 483 homes damaged in Myrtle Beach alone. In North Carolina, storm surge destroyed some bulkheads and dunes, while water flooded streets and entered the ground floors of businesses in downtown Wilmington. An EF3 tornado in Bertie County demolished several mobile homes and stick-built dwellings, killing two people and injuring 14. Strong winds, storm surge, and many tornadoes left significant damage in the Northeastern United States. Almost 3 million people were without electricity at the height of the storm, including over 1 million people in New Jersey alone. Isaias caused 17 deaths across the Greater Antilles and eastern United States: 14 in the continental United States, 2 in the Dominican Republic, and 1 in Puerto Rico. Damage estimates exceeded $4.8 billion, with almost $3.5 billion of which occurring in the Northeastern United States, making Isaias the costliest tropical cyclone to strike the region since Hurricane Sandy in 2012.

Tropical Depression Ten

On July 28, a tropical wave emerged off the west coast of Africa. The system soon developed a defined low pressure center on July 29 as it turned north along the east side of an upper-level low. Scatterometer data revealed conflicting data, with tropical storm-force winds noted in one pass within the deepest convection to the southwest of the storm's center where the weakest winds are typically found. A near-concurrent pass from another satellite showed lower winds and the highest winds were determined to be rain-inflated, and given the conflicting data the NHC determined the system to have not become a tropical storm. Thereafter, a combination of decreasing sea surface temperatures and dry air caused convection to dissipate. The depression turned west-northwest and degraded into a remnant low later that day. It soon dissipated on August 2 north of the Cabo Verde Islands.

Tropical Storm Josephine

On August 7, the NHC began monitoring a tropical wave over the tropical Atlantic. The wave's circulation then became defined and a low-pressure system with disorganized convection formed late on August 10. However, the depression's ability to intensify was initially hindered by dry mid-level air and moderate easterly wind shear. After over two days with little change in intensity, the shear relaxed some, allowing convection to begin to form closer to the estimated center of the depression.

Josephine's intensity began to fluctuate on August 14, as wind-shear affected the system, causing convection to be displaced from the circulation. Nonetheless, Josephine headed into increasingly hostile conditions as it began to pass north of the Leeward Islands. As a result, the storm later weakened, becoming a tropical depression at 06:00 UTC on August 16, just north of the Virgin Islands. The weakening cyclone's circulation became increasingly ill-defined, and Josephine eventually weakened into a trough of low pressure 12 hours later.

Tropical Storm Kyle

A mesoscale convective system moved offshore of South Carolina and Georgia early on August 11. The convective activity weakened that day, but a small mid-level circulation formed from the system and it re-developed some thunderstorm activity that night while it moved slowly northeastward off the coast of South Carolina. This activity generated the development of a weak low-level circulation that moved near the coast of southern North Carolina late on August 12. The system became better organized the next day, although it lacked a well-defined center and banding features. The low then moved offshore of the Outer Banks early on August 14, and deep convection increased as most of the circulation was over the warm water temperatures in the Atlantic. The storm then moved quickly east-northeastward along the Gulf Stream due to the flow between a broad mid-level trough over the Northeastern United States and the western Atlantic subtropical ridge. The storm began to weaken afterward due to increasing shear and interaction with a stationary front; its circulation began to become elongated as a result. Kyle became an extratropical cyclone when it embedded itself within the front at 00:00 UTC August 16. Its center dissipated and the remnants were absorbed into the front shortly thereafter. Several days later, extratropical European windstorm Ellen, which contained remnants of Tropical Storm Kyle, brought hurricane-force winds to the Republic of Ireland and the United Kingdom.

Hurricane Laura

On August 16, a tropical wave exited the west coast of Africa and entered the Atlantic. The wave combined with a broad area of low pressure located a few hundred miles west-southwest of the Cabo Verde Islands on August 18. By 12:00 UTC that same day, the cyclone organized further and strengthened into Tropical Storm Laura. However, moderate wind shear then prohibited further intensification. The storm had a disorganized appearance in satellite imagery as it crossed the northern Leeward islands on August 21. It then became organized on August 22, while passing just south of the U.S. Virgin Islands and Puerto Rico. The storm weakened little as it moved across the mountainous terrain of Hispaniola.

Laura entered the Gulf of Mexico later on August 25, where it became a hurricane around 12:00 UTC that day. Later, while situated over the central Gulf, Laura began a period of rapid intensification, and by 12:00 UTC on August 26, the storm became a major Category 3 hurricane. The hurricane became the strongest  tropical cyclone in terms of wind speed since the 1856 Last Island hurricane. Laura steadily weakened after moving inland, dropping to tropical storm strength around 18:00 UTC over northern Louisiana and then to a tropical depression over Arkansas early on August 28. The deteriorating system then turned northeastward and degenerated into a remnant low over northern Kentucky by 06:00 UTC on August 29. The remnant low was absorbed by another low centered near the Great Lakes region six hours later.

As Laura passed through the Northern Leeward Islands, it brought heavy rainfall to Guadeloupe and Dominica, and prompted the closing of all ports in the British Virgin Islands. The storm produced heavy downpours upon Puerto Rico and Hispaniola. The storm left extensive damage in Louisiana, especially in the southwest region of the state. Outside of the two parishes, Beauregard and Vernon parishes were next hardest hit, with the core of the storm passing directly over. Several other parishes reported damage to homes and buildings due to strong winds or falling trees. Laura destroyed approximately 10,000 homes and damaged over 130,000 others in the state. Damage in Louisiana alone totaled about $17.5 billion. Texas was second hardest hit by the storm, with high winds downing many power lines, power poles, and trees in the eastern part of the state, while some counties reported damage to businesses and homes. Laura produced 16 tornadoes in the United States, the most significant of them being an EF2 tornado in Randolph County, Arkansas. Altogether, there were 81 storm related deaths. Of these, 47 were direct deaths associated with Laura, including 31 in Haiti, 9 in the Dominican Republic, and 7 in the United States. There were also 34 indirect deaths, all of them in the United States.

Hurricane Marco

Between August 10 and August 11, a tropical wave entered into the Atlantic from the west coast of Africa. Convection remained poorly organized for several days as the wave moved eastward across the Atlantic and into the Caribbean. However, showers and thunderstorms within the wave became more concentrated as it reached the central Caribbean on August 19, with a low-pressure area developing on the next day. By 06:00 UTC on August 21, the wave possessed a closed circulation and sufficient organized convection, resulting in its designation as Tropical Depression Fourteen near the coasts of Nicaragua and Honduras. The system moved northwestward and intensified, becoming Tropical Storm Marco around 00:00 UTC on August 22, as it moved over the northwestern Caribbean. This strengthening trend continued as Marco moved through the Yucatán Channel. The storm made a westward turn as it neared the Louisiana coast later that day. Marco then weakened to a depression shortly after 00:00 UTC on August 25 and degenerated into a remnant low about six hours later, without making landfall.

Flash flooding occurred in some areas, prompting at least 14 people to seek shelter. Overflowing rivers caused flooding in the communities of Acacoyagua, Escuintla, and Tapachula. Floodwaters inundated many streets in Panama City Beach. Due to its dissipating state as it approached Louisiana, the storm caused minimal impact there. Overall, Marco left approximately $35 million in damage throughout its path.

Tropical Storm Omar

A vigorous mid to upper-level shortwave trough moved into the Southeastern United States on August 29. The shortwave trough then interacted with the remnants of a frontal system, resulting in the formation of a low-pressure area offshore northeast Florida on August 30. Dry air and vertical wind shear offset the warm sea surface temperatures as the system headed northeastward. However, following a burst in deep convection, the depression strengthened into Tropical Storm Omar around 12:00 UTC on September 1. An increase in wind shear kept Omar weak. Consequently, the storm struggled to maintain deep convection as it moved eastward and weakened to a tropical depression early on September 3. Omar decelerated due to a weak steering flow, turning northward on September 5, due to a southerly flow associated with a deep-layer trough. The low moved generally northward before being absorbed by a frontal system on the following day.

Hurricane Nana

On August 23, a tropical wave emerged into the Atlantic from the west coast of Africa. Convection increased noticeably as the wave crossed the Intertropical Convergence Zone and on August 27, when it was about halfway between the Cabo Verde Islands and the Lesser Antilles. After the system entered the Caribbean on August 30, convection became concentrated near the system's mid-level circulation center. The classification as a tropical storm was because the system already possessed tropical storm-force winds. By 18:00 UTC that same day, the storm strengthened, reaching sustained winds of  before moderate northerly shear briefly halted intensification and partially exposed the center of circulation; even so, its pressure continued to drop. After the shear abated slightly late on September 2, Nana redeveloped convection over its center and intensified into a hurricane at 03:00 UTC on September 3 near the coast of Belize. Once inland, Nana quickly weakened to a tropical storm six hours later and then a tropical depression late on September 3 near the Guatemala–Mexico border. It degenerated into a remnant low by 00:00 UTC on September 4, and dissipated shortly thereafter. The mid-level remnants of the system emerged over the Gulf of Tehuantepec where they regenerated into Tropical Storm Julio in the eastern Pacific on September 5.

Nana caused street flooding in the Bay Islands of Honduras. Winds caused extensive damage to avocado, banana, citrus, corn, and plantain crops, with hundreds of acres of banana and plantation crops destroyed. Damage Assessment and Need Analysis (DANA) teams reported 13 structures damaged in Silk Grass and 7 others in Hopkins, while 4 homes in Dangriga experienced roof damage. Elsewhere, however, structural impacts were limited. Total economic losses in Belize exceeded $20 million. Heavy amounts of precipitation also occurred in northern Guatemala and southeastern Mexico.

Hurricane Paulette 

On September 2, a tropical wave emerged into the Atlantic from the west coast of Africa. The wave organized over the eastern Atlantic and formed a low-pressure area on September 6, as it moved generally westward. About 12 hours later, the depression intensified into Tropical Storm Paulette. The storm moved generally west-northwestward while gradually intensifying. Despite unfavorable conditions, Paulette began to re-intensify on September 11. Dry air entrainment gave the storm a somewhat ragged appearance, but Paulette continued to slowly strengthen as it approached Bermuda, with its eye clearing out and its convection becoming more symmetric.

After gradually weakening over the following few days and slowly curving southward, the extratropical cyclone began to redevelop a warm core as the convection associated with the low gradually increased in coverage and organization. Although the remnant low briefly re-strengthened again, drier and more stable air as well as colder ocean temperatures prevented redevelopment. The low meandered to the south of the Azores before degenerating into a trough of low pressure late on September 28.

Paulette produced hurricane-force winds on Bermuda, with sustained winds reaching  at Pearl Island and surface-level gusts reaching  at L.F. Wade International Airport. Trees and power lines were downed throughout Bermuda as Paulette passed over, leading to roughly 25,000 power outages, which accounts for approximately 70 percent of electrical customers on the island. Damage on Bermuda totaled approximately $50 million. There were two direct deaths and one injury associated with Paulette, each of which occurred due to rip currents along the Atlantic coast of the United States. Between September 13 and September 15, several water rescues were conducted along the coast of New Jersey.

Tropical Storm Rene 

A tropical wave emerged off the coast of Africa over the Atlantic Ocean on September 6. A well-defined low-pressure area already existed, though convection initially remained limited. Convection consolidated and organized further, with banding developing later that day, while the depression intensified into Tropical Storm Rene about 12 hours later. Dry air and only marginally warm seas caused convection to wane and Rene weakened to a tropical depression several hours later. After another burst in deep convection early on September 9, the cyclone re-strengthened into a tropical storm. Showers and thunderstorms decreased starting on the following day due to dry air and Rene weakened to a tropical depression on September 12. The remnants turned southwestward and dissipated a few days later.

Rene brought gusty winds and heavy rain to the Cabo Verde Islands on September 8. A tropical storm warning was issued for the islands on September 7, which remained in effect though late the next day.

Hurricane Sally

In early September, a well-defined surface trough developed over the western Atlantic just south of Bermuda. The trough moved slowly west-southwestward towards the Bahamas, where it produced disorganized convection beginning on September 10. By 18:00 UTC on September 11, convection within the system became better organized and a well-defined center of circulation developed, marking the formation of Tropical Depression Nineteen between Andros Island and Bimini in the Bahamas. Six hours later, while its center was over the Everglades, the depression strengthened into Tropical Storm Sally. Sally emerged over the Gulf of Mexico a few hours later and turned to the northwest once offshore. Moderate northwesterly shear hindered its steady strengthening. When the shear decreased somewhat early the next day, a burst of deep convection developed near and to the east of the storm's center and it began to go through a period of rapid intensification. After weakening to  early on September 15, Sally slowed to a crawl while turning north-northeastward. Later that same day, Sally began a second period of rapid intensification, becoming a high-end Category 2 hurricane by 06:00 UTC September 16. Sally rapidly weakened to a tropical storm by 18:00 UTC as it moved slowly inland. Later, the storm weakened to a tropical depression by 06:00 UTC on September 17, and became an extratropical low six hours later over eastern Alabama. It was subsequently absorbed within a cold front and dissipated over South Carolina on the following day.

In its early stages, Sally dropped heavy rainfall in South Florida. Winds uprooted some trees and knocked down power lines, leaving about 10,000 customers without power. The hurricane lashed the Florida Panhandle with strong winds, heavy precipitation, and storm surge. Approximately 50 structures were demolished, while thousands of others in Escambia and Santa Rosa counties suffered damage. Flooding left numerous roads impassable and washed out several roads and bridges. The widespread uprooting of trees and damaged power lines left at least 245,000 customers without electricity. In Alabama, hurricane-force winds in Baldwin and Mobile counties damaged many buildings, uprooted numerous trees and knocked down power lines, causing 275,000 electrical customers to lose power. Farther inland, heavy rainfall left several roads impassable and washed out in Coffee, Crenshaw, and Escambia counties. In Mississippi, storm surge inundated 100 low-lying roads in Hancock County and 60 others in Jackson County. Falling trees blocked some roads and damaged some homes in the latter. Storm surge in Louisiana left some roads impassable in low-lying areas of Jefferson, Orleans, Plaquemines, St. Bernard, and St. Tammany parishes. Flash flooding impacted portions of Georgia, especially in Washington County and the Augusta and Waynesboro areas. Some trees were uprooted due to saturated grounds, leaving around 30,000 customers without power. Overall, there were 23 tornadoes reported across the Southeastern United States while Sally was a tropical cyclone, including 12 in South Carolina, 6 in Georgia, 4 in North Carolina, and 1 in Florida. The storm was responsible for nine fatalities – three in Florida and two each in Alabama and Georgia – and approximately $7.3 billion in damage.

Hurricane Teddy

A tropical wave emerged into the Atlantic from the west coast of Africa on September 10. Though the wave was experiencing moderate northeasterly shear, convection increased early on September 12, which led to the development of a well-defined surface center. After overcoming a combination of northeasterly shear, dry air in the mid-levels and the large size and radius of maximum winds of the system, the depression strengthened into Tropical Storm Teddy around 00:00 UTC on September 14. Late the next day, the storm began its first period of rapid intensification. The storm continued to intensify, becoming a Category 2 hurricane several hours later. Some slight westerly wind shear briefly halted further strengthening, but when it subsided, the storm began another period of rapid intensification early on September 17.

An eyewall replacement cycle late on September 18 caused the storm to weaken to a Category 3, while an increase in southwesterly shear caused Teddy to drop below major hurricane strength around 00:00 UTC on September 20. This interaction caused an increase in both the storm's maximum wind speed and size. Interaction with the trough also triggered the extratropical transition process; Teddy's wind field became more asymmetric, and the associated convection become less centralized. The system weakened as it moved northward across eastern Nova Scotia and then the Gulf of St. Lawrence, where it was absorbed by a larger non-tropical low early on September 24, near eastern Labrador.

The hurricane generated large ocean swells which spread along much of the U.S. Atlantic coast and from the northern Caribbean to Bermuda. Two people drowned in Puerto Rico due to rip currents generated by these swells on September 18, as did a swimmer in New Jersey. Abnormally high tides also caused coastal flooding in Charleston, South Carolina, and the Outer Banks of North Carolina. In the latter, waves swept away some sand dunes and pushed sand onto roadways. About 220 households lost power in Bermuda. Otherwise, impact was mainly limited to sand being deposited on roadways on the island's south coasts. Approximately 18,000 customers throughout the Atlantic Canada region lost electricity. There were also isolated reports of minor flooding. Damage from Teddy in all areas impacted totaled roughly $35 million.

Tropical Storm Vicky 

In the early hours of September 11, a tropical wave moved off the coast of Africa. An area of low pressure associated with the wave moved northwestward and crossed the Cabo Verde Islands on September 12, producing showers and locally heavy rain. The depression strengthened into Tropical Storm Vicky six hours later based on scatterometer data. Over the ensuing couple of days, the storm was beset by increasing wind shear, and it weakened to a tropical depression around 12:00 UTC on September 17.

The precursor tropical wave of Vicky produced flooding in the Cabo Verde Islands. Flooding blocked several roads and damaged automobiles, bridges, buildings, and farmland. The floods killed one person in Praia on September 12.

Tropical Storm Wilfred

A tropical wave and its associated broad low-pressure area emerged into the Atlantic from the west coast of Africa on September 13. A well-defined center of circulation formed on September 17 as the result of a strong burst of deep convection formed near the center of the low. Stronger and more organized convection appeared later that day, while a scatterometer pass revealed that the circulation had become better defined, and the presence of tropical-storm-force winds. Deep convection began to diminish on the following day, causing Wilfred to weaken to a tropical depression around 12:00 UTC.

Subtropical Storm Alpha

A large, extratropical low-pressure area developed over the northeast Atlantic Ocean on September 14, following the interaction between a surface front and an upper-level low. Although the low weakened as it headed south-southeastward, the wind field contracted and convection began forming closer to the circulation due to marginally warm sea surface temperatures and sufficient atmospheric instability. Around 00:00 UTC on September 19, Alpha weakened to a subtropical depression inland over north-central Portugal. Three hours later, it degenerated to a post-tropical remnant low near Viseu, Portugal. and dissipated shortly thereafter.

In preparation for Alpha on September 18, orange warnings were raised for high wind and heavy rain in Coimbra and Leiria districts of Portugal. High winds downed many trees and caused numerous power outages in coastal Portugal. The storm also spawned at least two tornadoes, both rated EF1 on the Enhanced Fujita scale. In Spain, the front associated with Alpha caused a train to derail in Madrid, while thunderstorms on Ons Island caused a forest fire. There were no reports of injuries or deaths related to Alpha while it was a subtropical cyclone, but its remnants caused one fatality in Spain, as a woman in Calzadilla died after a roof collapsed upon her. Overall, Alpha caused at least $1 million in damage.

Tropical Storm Beta

An area of disturbed weather, composed of a tropical wave, an upper-level low-pressure area, and a frontal trough, stretched from the western Caribbean to offshore the Southeastern United States on September 5 and September 6. Drifting westward, the disturbance reached the northeastern Gulf of Mexico and consolidated by September 12. However, development of the system was not expected at the time due to strong upper-level winds produced by Hurricane Sally, which made landfall in Alabama on September 16 and then moved across the Southeastern United States. The depression headed slowly northeastward and intensified, becoming Tropical Storm Beta late on September 18. Although dry air generated by a surface trough and an upper-level trough prevented Beta from rapidly intensifying, the cyclone was able to reach a peak wind speed of  around 12:00 UTC on September 20 and a minimum pressure of  around 00:00 UTC on the next day. Beta became nearly stationary after turning westward on September 20, causing upwelling and weakening the storm. By 18:00 UTC, the storm weakened to a tropical depression and turned east-northeastward. Beta soon became an extratropical low inland near the Texas coast. The extratropical low moved through the Deep South until dissipating over northeastern Alabama early on September 25.

Beta caused widespread moderate to major flooding in portions of the Greater Houston metropolitan area. Houston officials reported that over 100,000 gallons of domestic wastewater spilled at five locations in the city as a result. Rising floodwaters necessitated more than 100 high-water rescues and the closures of several highways and interstates in the area. At least 20-25 homes in the Houston metropolitan area suffered flood damage. Officials also reported that one man drowned in Brays Bayou. The extratropical remnants of Beta brought heavy rainfall to other states, especially Louisiana and Mississippi. Throughout the United States, Beta caused approximately $225 million in damage.

Hurricane Gamma

On September 21, a tropical wave emerged into the Atlantic from the west coast of Africa. Dry air limited convection associated with the wave for several days, before convection increased as the system reached the western Caribbean on September 30. The depression strengthened into Tropical Storm Gamma about 12 hours later. It quickly weakened to a tropical storm while crossing the northern Yucatán Peninsula. The storm then stalled for several hours before slowly commencing a move southwestward. During this time, increasing shear and intrusions of dry air weakened the storm, leaving its center exposed by early on October 5. By 18:00 UTC that day, Gamma weakened to a tropical depression. The storm was absorbed by Hurricane Delta by late on October 6, while its circulation promptly dissipated over land.

Numerous tropical storm watches and warnings were issued by the government of Mexico for parts of the Yucatán Peninsula following the formation of Gamma and several thousand people were evacuated to shelters. The storm produced strong winds, heavy rainfall, flash flooding, landslides, and mudslides in the region. Extensive flooding was reported in the city, while at least 30 people were forced to evacuate their homes due to rising floodwaters. In Progreso, many streets were inundated and floodwaters entered several homes on the outskirts of the city. In states outside of the Yucatán Peninsula region, water entered 11,457 homes, 10,815 of which were in Tabasco. Flooding in Chiapas damaged 543 homes, 326 roadways, 13 sections of a waterpipe network, and 2 schools. Gamma caused at least six deaths in Mexico, with four in Chiapas and two in Tabasco. Damage in Mexico totaled approximately $100 million. Gamma's outerbands also produced heavy rainfall in the Cayman Islands, Cuba, and Florida.

Hurricane Delta

A tropical wave emerged into the Atlantic from the west coast of Africa on September 26. There was little convection associated with the wave until September 30, with shower and thunderstorm activity increased. Convection then fluctuated as it moved across the Caribbean Sea due to moderate wind shear and dry air. However, a well-defined center of circulation formed with sufficiently organized deep convection around 18:00 UTC on October 4, marking the formation of Tropical Depression Twenty-Six. Thunderstorm activity continued to increase after formation, but was initially confined to the southern portion of the circulation due to northerly wind shear. Delta soon began to rapidly intensify, attaining hurricane strength 12 hours later. As it moved west-northwestward over the western Caribbean Sea, Delta became a Category 3 major hurricane by 12:00 UTC October 6. This period of rapid intensification resulted in a  increase in winds over a  period. This breakneck rate of strengthening was due to a combination of extremely warm ocean water temperatures, low wind shear, and sufficiently moist air aloft.

The hurricane weakened early on October 7 due to a slight increase in mid-level wind shear, which inhibited upper-level outflow from the storm and disrupted its small core. Delta spent several hours over the Yucatán Peninsula before emerging into the Gulf of Mexico north of Dzilam de Bravo, Yucatán, as a Category 1 hurricane around 18:00 UTC. Moving northwestward and situated in generally favorable atmospheric and oceanic conditions, Delta again intensified, strengthening back to a major hurricane within 24 hours. During the day, however, an increase in southwesterly shear and a decrease in the oceanic heat content over the northern Gulf of Mexico caused Delta to weaken to Category 2 strength as it moved toward the southwestern Louisiana coast. Inland, Delta weakened to tropical storm strength at 06:00 UTC on October 10 near Alexandria, Louisiana. The storm continued to weaken that day as it turned northeastward, becoming extratropical over Mississippi by 18:00 UTC and subsequently degenerating into a trough of low pressure over Tennessee on October 12.

As Delta was nearing landfall in Quintana Roo, Mexican president Andrés Manuel López Obrador announced on October 6 the activation of the DN-III emergency plan and the mobilization of 5,000 soldiers of the Mexican Armed Forces to help with the evacuation of sheltering people in the region. There were numerous reports of uprooted trees and damage to the region's electrical grids, with approximately one-third of the region's population losing power. The storm caused significant flooding in Cozumel and Playa del Carmen. Overall, damage in Mexico totaled approximately $185 million. As Delta moved into the northern Gulf of Mexico, widespread watches and warnings were issued along the U.S. Gulf Coast. States of emergency were declared in Louisiana, Mississippi, and Alabama and numerous coastal, low-lying, and flood prone areas were evacuated. The hurricane and its remnants produced heavy rain, strong winds, storm surge, and tornadoes across much of the Southeastern United States. In Louisiana, strong winds generated by Delta caused additional damage to structures that were impacted by Laura, while debris remaining since the Laura were scattered across roadways and drains. Floodwaters entered several homes in Baton Rouge and Calcasieu. In Mississippi, roughly 100,000 businesses and homes lost electricity after rainfall and tropical storm-force wind gusts uprooted trees. Damage from Delta in the United States reached $2.9 billion. Altogether, there were six storm-related fatalities, two each in the Yucatán, Louisiana, and Florida.

Hurricane Epsilon

An upper-level trough associated with a weak baroclinic low-pressure area moved offshore the East Coast of the United States on October 13. A cold front moved into the vicinity on the system two days later, before degenerating into a surface trough. The interaction of these systems led to the formation of a non-tropical surface low on October 16. The low drifted southward into an area of warmer sea surface temperatures, allowing convection to expand and organize. Six hours later, the system strengthened into Tropical Storm Epsilon, and then slowly intensified the following day, as it encountered sporadic bouts of dry-air intrusion imported by moderate vertical wind shear while executing a small counter-clockwise loop. The vertical shear subsided somewhat and the remaining dry air was ejected from the core between  enabling the storm to undergo rapid intensification, despite relatively cool sea temperatures and moderate wind shear remaining. Epsilon was also the farthest east a major hurricane had been observed after October 20. However, the storm quickly weakened to Category 1 strength as its inner core eroded, though Epsilon then maintained this intensity over the next two days. Epsilon turned sharply northeast and accelerated on October 24, slowly weakening as it approached the north extent of the Gulf Stream. Epsilon's remnants were later absorbed into a deep extratropical low southwest of Iceland.

The hurricane's large wind field prompted the issuance of a tropical storm watch for Bermuda at 15:00 UTC on October 20, which was later upgraded to a warning 24 hours later. Although the Bermuda Weather Service anticipated that hurricane-force winds would not impact the island, the Government of Bermuda warned residents to prepare for power outages and to check their emergency supplies. Additionally, Dangerous Surf Advisory signs were posted at south shore beaches. As it began moving away from Bermuda on October 23, the tropical storm warning was cancelled. The hurricane also generated large sea swells from Bermuda to the Bahamas, the Greater Antilles, and the Leeward Islands. The hurricane caused one direct death; a 27-year-old man drowned in Epsilon-induced rip currents in Daytona Beach, Florida.

Hurricane Zeta

A large area of unsettled weather developed due to the combination of a tropical wave and a midlevel trough October 18–October 19 over the southwestern Caribbean Sea. The system drifted west-northwestward to near Grand Cayman on October 23. Thereafter, deep convection increased overnight into the morning of October 24. Around 12:00 UTC, satellite data indicated that a well-defined low formed, marking the formation of Tropical Depression Twenty-Eight. Despite experiencing some north-northwestwardly shear, the storm steadily intensified, and reached hurricane strength by 06:00 UTC on October 26. After weakening to a tropical storm inland, Zeta moved offshore of the northern coast of the Yucatán Peninsula about 11 hours later just east of Telchac Puerto. Dry air wrapped around the northern half of Zeta's circulation as it moved offshore over the southern Gulf of Mexico, leaving its center partially exposed. However, the storm soon encountered a conducive environment of low shear and warm sea surface temperatures, allowing Zeta to become a hurricane again early on October 28; this marked the start of a period of rapid intensification. Zeta steadily lost strength after landfall, weakening to a tropical storm over Alabama at 06:00 UTC on October 29, before transitioning into a post-tropical cyclone over central Virginia by 18:00 UTC that day, while moving rapidly northeastward. Early on October 30, Zeta's remnants dissipated east of the mid-Atlantic U.S. coast.

Heavy rain in Jamaica caused a landslide that killed two people after demolishing a home in Saint Andrew Parish. Zeta left roughly $15 million in damage on the island. Strong winds and rain caused flooding and damaged infrastructure in Mexico's Yucatán Peninsula. Zeta knocked out power to more than 2.6 million homes and businesses across the Southeastern United States; it also disrupted 2020 election early voting in several states. Strong winds caused significant damage to hundreds of homes in Jefferson, Lafourche, Orleans, Plaquemines, St. Bernard, and Terrebonne parishes, while some 100 homes were destroyed. Storm surge resulted in coastal flooding, especially in Lafourche and Jefferson parishes, with water entering buildings in Golden Meadow and Leesville. Roughly 500,000 households in the state lost electricity. Areas of extreme southern Mississippi reported severe wind damage, as hurricane-force winds also impacted the state's coastal counties. Around 10,000 homes in Mississippi were damaged. Storm surge inundated hundreds of roads in the vicinity of Bay St. Louis, while Route 90 was submerged in Harrison County. Much of the rest of the state reported generally minor impact. Coastal Alabama suffered storm surge flooding, inundating roads and damaging some businesses and properties. Farther inland, winds damaged hundreds of homes, knocked down a number of power lines and uprooted trees. In Georgia, Zeta left extensive damage from the Atlanta metropolitan area northward due to tropical storm-force wind gusts. Within the Atlanta area, strong winds damaged many traffic signals and uprooted trees, blocking many roads and causing property damage. Heavy rains also produced flooding in Rabun and Union counties. Approximately 1 million people lost electricity. The storm uprooted hundreds of trees, damaged hundreds of homes, and caused flash flooding in parts of North Carolina. Similar but slightly lesser impacts occurred in South Carolina. Zeta also damaged hundreds of power lines and uprooted trees in Virginia, though structural damage was mostly minor. As the remnants of Zeta moved off shore from the continental U.S., it left behind accumulating snow across parts of New England. There were seven related deaths in the United States: three in Georgia; two in Mississippi; and one each in Louisiana and Mississippi. Damage within the United States totaled $4.4 billion, with at least $1.25 billion incurred in Louisiana, $1.1 billion in Georgia, $840 million in Alabama, $635 million in Mississippi, $550 million in the Carolinas, and $25 million in Virginia.

Hurricane Eta

On October 29, the NHC began monitoring a disturbance interacting with a pair of tropical waves while moving across the Lesser Antilles and into the eastern Caribbean Sea. On October 30, the disturbance moved west-northwestward and gradually became better organized. Eta strengthened extremely rapidly through that day, and by 18:00 UTC it had intensified into a Category 4 hurricane. Eta rapidly weakened over land, moving westward, diminishing to a tropical storm by 12:00 UTC on November 4, and to a tropical depression early the following day while moving northward over central Honduras. There, its surface circulation appeared to dissipate, but an associated low- to mid-tropospheric circulation center remained present.

The disturbance then emerged over the Gulf of Honduras just before 00:00 UTC on November 6, where it re-acquired a surface circulation, re-developing into a tropical depression to the east of Belize around six hours later. It regained tropical storm status around 06:00 UTC on November 7, as it accelerated east-northeastward across the Caribbean Sea. Next, after moving into the Gulf of Mexico, Eta briefly re-strengthened into a hurricane southwest of Florida on November 11, before weakening back to tropical storm strength. The storm weakened over land, emerging over the Atlantic Ocean near the Florida–Georgia state line later that day. Eta re-intensified slightly on November 13 while moving northeastward off the coast of the Carolinas, before transitioning into an extratropical cyclone later that day.

Hurricane and tropical storm watches and warnings were issued along the Caribbean coast of Honduras and of northeastern Nicaragua as Eta approached. The intense wind and rain generated by Eta caused flooding and landslides, resulting in crop losses, plus the destruction of roads, bridges, power lines and houses throughout Central America. Eta also damaged hundreds of dwellings to some degree in both Guatemala and Honduras. Washed out bridges and roads isolated more than 40 communities in the latter. Mexico suffered significant impacts as well, with thousands of homes damaged in Chiapas and Tabasco. Overall, more than 210 fatalities across Central America were attributed to the storm, including 74 in Honduras, 60 in Guatemala, 27 in Mexico, 19 in Panama, two each in Nicaragua and Costa Rica, and one in El Salvador. Damage in Central America reached approximately $6.8 billion. Tropical storm watches were issued on November 5 in the Cayman Islands, followed by more watches in Cuba, the northwestern Bahamas, and South Florida. Eta bought heavy rainfall and gusty winds to the Cayman Islands and Cuba, the latter of which was already dealing with overflowing rivers that prompted the evacuations of 25,000 people. Heavy rainfall and tropical-storm force winds were recorded across much of Florida as a result of Eta's two landfalls there, causing widespread flooding, especially in Broward and Miami-Dade counties. Streets remained inundated in both counties for several days, while floodwaters entered homes in parts of Broward County. More than 290,000 customers lost electricity in the Miami metropolitan area. Eta also caused some coastal and freshwater flooding in the Tampa Bay area, while over 40,000 customers in the region lost power. The storm then interacted with a cold front, causing flash flooding in Georgia and the Carolinas. Eta caused roughly $1.5 billion in damage in the United States and at least ten deaths, with nine in North Carolina and one in Florida.

Tropical Storm Theta

On November 6, the NHC began monitoring a non-tropical area of disturbed weather in the central Atlantic for possible gradual subtropical development. The system became better organized as it began to detach from a frontal boundary during the following day. At 00:00 UTC on November 10, it developed into Subtropical Storm Theta. By the following morning, the effects of strong southwesterly shear had weakened Theta somewhat, though it soon began to regain some strength, and by 00:00 UTC on November 12, re-intensified to its earlier peak.

Hurricane Iota

A tropical wave emerged into the Atlantic from the west coast of Africa at a low-latitude on October 30. The wave moved westward and remained disorganized for several days. Deep convection increased significantly on November 12 while the system was located over the central Caribbean, becoming a broad low-pressure area that day. Six hours later, the system strengthened into Tropical Storm Iota. Environmental conditions at the time—low vertical wind shear, extremely warm sea surface temperatures and a moist atmosphere—were favorable for rapid or even explosive intensification of the storm into a major hurricane. Data from Air Force Reserve reconnaissance aircraft indicated that Iota had strengthened  and that its central pressure had fallen  during the 42 hours preceding this achievement. Afterward, the hurricane weakened some as it passed over the relatively cool wake created nearly two weeks earlier by Hurricane Eta. After moving inland, Iota rapidly weakened over the mountainous terrain of Nicaragua, becoming a tropical storm by 18:00 UTC that day while located over western Nicaragua. Then, after moving over southern Honduras and east-central El Salvador, it weakened to a tropical depression by 12:00 UTC on November 18. Iota dissipated over western El Salvador several hours later.

In Venezuela, flooding due to heavy rainfall damaged 288 homes in the state of Falcón, with most located in the Paraguaná Peninsula. The government of Colombia issued a hurricane warning for Providencia and a hurricane watch for the island of San Andrés on November 14. Iota caused extreme damage in the archipelago of San Andrés, Providencia and Santa Catalina. The hurricane demolished approximately 98 percent of the infrastructure on Providencia Island – including buildings constructed as early as the 15th century – while all homes were damaged to some degree. Portions of the mainland also suffered major damage, particularly in the Guajira Peninsula. Floodwaters impacted approximately 70 percent of the city of Cartagena. A total of 1,043 homes were damaged in Atlántico Department alone. Ten direct deaths occurred in Colombia. Hurricane warnings were issued for portions of the Caribbean coast of Nicaragua and of Honduras on November 14. In the former, wind damage was limited to an extent due to the recent passage of Hurricane Eta. However, the cyclone knocked down many electrical poles and deroofed many homes and a makeshift hospital in the Bilwi area. Heavy rainfall, combined with already saturated soil due to Eta, caused widespread flooding and mudslides. Iota caused at least 56 deaths in Nicaragua, 39 directly and 17 indirectly. Heavy precipitation resulted in flooding and mudslides in Honduras, especially close to or north of Iota's path, completely destroying numerous homes. At least 13 people in Honduras were killed due to the direct effects of Iota. Mexico also reported extensive impacts from the storm, especially in Chiapas, Tabasco, and Veracruz. Floodwaters and mudslides damaged almost 59,000 homes and left 135 communities isolated. Overall, Iota directly or indirectly caused at least 84 deaths, and total damage estimates for the hurricane amounted to $1.4 billion, about $1.25 billion of which was incurred in Honduras and Nicaragua.

Storm names

The following list of names was used for named storms that formed in the North Atlantic in 2020. As more than 21 named storms occurred, storms that formed after Wilfred were assigned names from the auxiliary list, which corresponded to the letters of the Greek alphabet. Use of this naming protocol had only happened once before, in 2005. The list of storm names for the 2020 season was the same list used in the 2014 season, as no names were retired from that year. The names Isaias, Paulette, Rene, Sally, Teddy, Vicky, and Wilfred from the regular list were used for the first time this year, as were the auxiliary list names Eta, Theta, and Iota. Isaias and Paulette replaced Ike and Paloma, respectively, after 2008, but both names went unused in 2014.

Retirement

On March 17, 2021, during the joint 42nd and 43rd Sessions of the RA IV Hurricane Committee in the spring of 2021, the World Meteorological Organization (WMO) retired the name Laura, replacing it with Leah for the 2026 season. The letters Eta and Iota were also retired. The WMO did not retire the names of several 2020 hurricanes that caused extensive damage, specifically: Isaias, Sally, Delta and Zeta. This made Sally, the most destructive of the four, the most expensive non-retired North Atlantic hurricane on record, with a damage total of around $7.3 billion (2020 USD).

End of Greek alphabet usage
After the 2005 season, the WMO decided to keep using the Greek letter names as an auxiliary list each year. It also determined that the retirement of a Greek alphabet name (removing it from use), was not feasible. Instead, the WMO put a policy in place whereby a storm with a Greek letter name found worthy of retirement would be included in the list of retired names along with the year of occurrence, but the Greek letter would continue to be available for use in future years. In 2020, several highly devastating storms with Greek letter names, particularly Eta and Iota (which, under the previous policy, would have been retired as "Eta (2020)" and "Iota (2020)" respectively), prompted concerns from meteorologists, including retired Hurricane Specialist Unit chief James Franklin, that the current policy would defeat the purpose of name retirement. On March 17, 2021, the WMO announced that the use of the Greek list would be discontinued to avoid confusion. Instead, if the regular naming list is exhausted, an auxiliary list consisting of 21 given names would be used, which will allow the names to be retired.

Season effects
This is a table of the tropical cyclones that formed in the 2020 Atlantic hurricane season. It includes their duration, names, intensities, areas affected, damage and death totals. Deaths in parentheses are additional and indirect (an example of an indirect death would be a traffic accident), but were still related to that storm. Damage and deaths include totals while the storm was extratropical, a wave, or a low. All of the damage figures are in 2020 USD.

See also

 Tropical cyclones in 2020
 Atlantic hurricane season
 List of Atlantic hurricane records
 Mediterranean tropical-like cyclone
 South Atlantic tropical cyclone
 2020 Pacific hurricane season
 2020 Pacific typhoon season
 2020 North Indian Ocean cyclone season
 South-West Indian Ocean cyclone seasons: 2019–20, 2020–21
 Australian region cyclone seasons: 2019–20, 2020–21
 South Pacific cyclone seasons: 2019–20, 2020–21

Notes

References

External links

 National Hurricane Center Website
 National Hurricane Center's Atlantic Tropical Weather Outlook
 Tropical Cyclone Formation Probability Guidance Product
 Atlantic Tropical Cyclone Reports

 
Articles which contain graphical timelines
Atlantic hurricane seasons
Tropical cyclones in 2020